The enzyme 2-hydroxyisoflavanone dehydratase catalyzes the chemical reaction

2,7,4′-trihydroxyisoflavanone  daidzein + H2O

This enzyme belongs to the family of lyases, specifically the hydro-lyases, which cleave carbon-oxygen bonds.  The systematic name of this enzyme class is 2,7,4′-trihydroxyisoflavanone hydro-lyase (daidzein-forming). This enzyme is also called 2,7,4′-trihydroxyisoflavanone hydro-lyase.  This enzyme participates in isoflavonoid biosynthesis.

The variant GmHID1 from Glycine max converts 2-hydroxyisoflavone to isoflavones, mostly daidzein and genistein.

References 

 

EC 4.2.1
Enzymes of unknown structure
Isoflavonoids metabolism